Rangang–Yangang Assembly constituency is one of the 32 Legislative Assembly constituencies of Sikkim state in India.

It is part of South Sikkim district.

Member of the Legislative Assembly

Election results

2019

See also
 List of constituencies of the Sikkim Legislative Assembly
 South Sikkim district

References

Namchi district
Assembly constituencies of Sikkim